WQYQ (1400 AM) is a radio station broadcasting an alternative rock format. Licensed to St. Joseph, Michigan, it first began broadcasting in 1956 as WSJM. Programming is simulcast on a local translator on 106.1 FM (W291DK).

Through the late 1980s and early 1990s, WSJM was a Full-Service Adult Contemporary radio station, with a mixture of pop and oldies music, local personalities, network and local newscasts, evening talk programming (Bruce Williams and Larry King) and play-by-play sports. For many years, the station's slogan was "The Spirit of the Southwest." Before WSJM's 1984 format change to Full-Service A/C, it had a country music format called "The Best in the Country."

WSJM started simulcasting on 94.9 FM in early 2008. "The Coast", which had been on that frequency, then moved to 98.3 FM. The WCSY call letters were moved from 98.3 FM to 103.7 FM as part of this three station swap. The WSJM-FM call sign were temporarily placed on 98.3 FM until all moves were complete. "The Coast" changed call letters a few weeks later from "WCNF" to "WCXT". In August 2014, WSJM switched from a news/talk format (simulcast with WSJM-FM 94.9, which continued as a news/talk station). The programming was a mix of Fox Sports Radio, regional sports talk, and local and national play-by-play.

On July 20, 2020, WSJM switched from sports to alternative rock, exclusively only mentioning the frequency of the FM translator station. The station changed its call sign to WQYQ at the same time.

Previous logo
 (WSJM's logo under previous 95.7 translator)

References

Michiguide.com - WSJM History

External links

QYQ
Radio stations established in 1956
1956 establishments in Michigan
Modern rock radio stations in the United States